Released in October 1981, Elvis: Greatest Hits Vol. 1 was an attempt by RCA Records at launching a new series of reissues featuring American rock and roll singer, Elvis Presley. Ultimately, however, only this single volume was released in this particular series.

Despite its title, the album is thematically similar to the Elvis: A Legendary Performer series of albums RCA issued between 1974 and 1983, in that it consisted of a mixture of previously released recordings and previously unissued performances. In this case, the unreleased material consisted of live performances from Las Vegas and Nashville.

The collection received mixed reviews, with Roy Carr and Mick Farren, in Elvis: The Illustrated Record, a book released the following year, calling the album title misleading: "Predictable Las Vegas standards hardly fall under the category of 'Greatest Hits,'" they write. "One seriously wonders exactly who records like this are aimed at," they continue, wondering if RCA did indeed have anymore notable material from Elvis that had yet to be released (as subsequent releases proved, the label did possess many more previously unreleased recordings).

Besides the aforementioned unreleased live recordings, this album also includes the true stereo debut of the songs "Suspicious Minds" (previously issued only in mono), and "The Sound Of Your Cry" (which was released for the first time on an Elvis album).

Track listing
All previously released unless noted:

Chart performance

References

Albums produced by Felton Jarvis
Elvis Presley compilation albums
1981 compilation albums
Compilation albums published posthumously
RCA Records compilation albums